The Toyota K CVT transmission is a series of continuously variable transmissions (CVT) found in many Toyota automobiles. The transmissions are manufactured by Aisin, a automotive parts manufacturer that is part of the Toyota Group of companies. A CVT is a type of automatic transmission that can change seamlessly through a continuous range of gear ratios. This contrasts with other transmissions that provide a limited number of gear ratios in fixed steps. The K series uses two pulleys connected by a belt.

K110/K111/K112 series (2000)

K110
The K110 was Toyota's first belt-type CVT and production began in August 2000. Toyota said that the transmission was both fuel-efficient and offered high driving performance. The K110 features a torque converter with a long-travel damper to help achieve quiet operation and improved fuel efficiency. 

Applications:
 Toyota Opa – 2.0L (2000–2005)
 Toyota Allion, Premio, Wish – 2.0L (2001–2011)
 Toyota Voxy – 2.0L (2007–2011)
 Toyota Auris & Corolla Axio / Fielder
 Toyota Ractis & Sienta
 Toyota Vitz

K111
The K111 transmission is an improved version of K110 introduced in July 2004. The K111 adds neutral-gear control and acceleration linear control.

Applications:
 Toyota Noah, Voxy – 2.0L (2004–2007)
 Toyota Corolla (E140) – 2.0L (ZRE143, 2010-2014)

K112
The K112 transmission, introduced in October 2005, is a modified version of the K111 that is built to work with higher displacement 2.4L engines.

Applications:
 Toyota Alphard – 2.4L (2008–2017)
 Toyota Blade – 2.4L (2006–2011)
 Toyota Estima – 2.4L (2006–2017)
 Toyota Mark X Zio – 2.4L (2007–2011)
 Toyota RAV4 – 2.0/2.4/2.5L (2005–2011)
 Toyota Vanguard – 2.4L (2007–2011) 
 Toyota Opa

K114

Applications:
 Toyota C-HR/IZOA – 2.0L (2018–present)

K120 "Direct Shift" transmission (2018)
Toyota brands the K120 as the “Direct Shift” CVT and includes a physical first gear (also known as a "launch gear") and nine additional simulated gears, for a total of 10. The launch gear is engaged when the car takes off from being stopped and transitions to the belt drive once the car picks up speed. The benefit of this system is that traditional CVTs tend to have low efficiency in lower gear ratios (creating a moment of sluggishness when starting from a stop). Since the belts in this CVT are handling a more narrow band of gear ratios, belt angles and loads can be reduced, increasing shift speeds and offering a claimed 6% improvement in fuel efficiency. Production began in October 2018.

Applications:
 Toyota Yaris (XP210) and Yaris Cross (2020–present)
 Toyota Corolla/Auris/Allion/Levin GT (E210) – 2.0L (2018–present)
 Toyota Camry (XV70) – 2.0L (2019–present)
 Toyota Avalon (XX50) – 2.0L (2019–present)
 Toyota Corolla Cross - 2.0L (2021–present)
 Toyota Innova/Kijang Innova Zenix (2022–present)
 Toyota RAV4 (XA50)/Wildlander – 2.0L (2018–present)
 Toyota Harrier (XU80) - 2.0L (2021–present)
 Lexus ES 200 (2020–present)

 Lexus UX 200 (2018–present)

 Toyota Noah/ Voxy (R90) - 2.0L (2022–present)

 Toyota Sienta (XP210) - 1.5L (2022–present)

K210 transmission (2002)
Achieve both high fuel efficiency and high powertrain performance through size and weight reductions and are perfect suited for vehicles in the 1.5- to 1.8-liter class. Production began December 2002.  Later in February 2003 Toyota achieves fuel efficiency improvements through its Intelligent Idling Stop System developed by adding an electronic oil pump to the K210 belt-type CVT, ensuring excellent startup performance during engine restarts and producing class-leading fuel efficiency.

Applications:
 Toyota Vitz
 Toyota Ractis

K310/K311/K312/K313 series (2006)
Achieve both high fuel efficiency and high powertrain performance through size and weight reductions and are suitable for vehicles in the 1.5- to 1.8-liter class. Production began in September 2006.

Current applications:
 Toyota Corolla (K311), Altis – 1.8L (2010–present)
 Toyota Corolla Cross (K311) – 1.8L (2020–present)
 Toyota C-HR (K312) – 1.2L (2017–present)
 Toyota Vios (K312) – 1.5L (2016–present)
 Toyota Yaris (K312) –  1.5L (2016–present)
 Toyota Sienta (K313) - 1.5L (2015-present)

Previous applications:
 Toyota Auris, Corolla, Rumion – 1.5/1.8L (2006-2011)
 Toyota Allion, Premio – 1.5/1.8L, IST 1.5L (2007-2011)
 Toyota Avensis – 1.8/2.0L (2008-2011)
 Toyota Isis, Verso (K311), Wish – 1.8L (2009-2011)
 Toyota Probox, Succeed – 1.5L (2010-2011)

Final drive:
5.698:1 (when fitted to 1.5L Allion & Premio 1NZ-FE and 1.8L Corolla 2ZR-FE)  
5.356:1 (when fitted to 1.8L Allion & Premio 2ZR-FE)

K410/K411/K41 series (2004)

K410
Achieves both high fuel efficiency and high powertrain performance through size and weight reductions.  Designed for vehicles with engine displacements between 1- and 1.3-liters. Production began December 2004.

Applications:
 Toyota Belta
 Toyota Vitz
 Several other models

Final drive:
5.833:1 (when fitted to 1L 1KR-FE)
5.08:1  (when fitted to 1.3L 1NR-FE)

K41A
A version of the K410 transmission with the differential shifted forward to maximize space the Toyota iQ, a compact city car that was engineered to maximize passenger space, while minimizing exterior length. Production began October 2008.

Applications:
 Toyota iQ

K41B
Created by increasing the capacity of the K41A CVT, for 1.3-liter engines. Production began April 2009.

Applications:
 Toyota iQ

K411
Based on the K410 and adopting a flex-start control mechanism for the first time in a Toyota CVT; Lock-up clutch actively activated during startup to run the engine in the most efficient operating region, thereby improving fuel efficiency. Production began December 2010.

Applications:
 Several models including Corolla, Auris, Vitz, Vios, Yaris, and Echo

See also
 Toyota Drivetrain technical development

References

K CVT transmission
Aisin transmissions
Continuously variable transmissions